Santa tracker may refer to:
Google Santa Tracker
NORAD Tracks Santa